TRT 2 (TRT Second) is a Turkish culture and art television channel.

Introduction 

TRT 2 started test transmissions on September 15, 1986 as "2. Kanal", and is now TRT's second-most-watched TV station. 
TRT 2 programs include education, culture (documentaries, arts, culture programs and debates), news (daily agenda, economics, arts and culture), sports, various music, drama (drama series, modern adaptations, selected works from Turkish and world cinema, cartoons and series for children). Since February 22, 2019, TRT Haber (TRT News Turkish) became a separate 24-hour-news channel and TRT 2 repositions itself as a separate channel for cultural and educational programming, arts, talkshows & documentaries, replacing the educational channel TRT Okul.

Programming 

The channel has a focus on culture and arts and offers highbrow programming.
Programmes and content include:

Current programming 

 Cinema 7 – News about the latest cinema releases in Turkey, interviews with top directors plus other features.
 From World Cinemas – A subtitled world cinema film every Friday night.
 Documentaries – Produced by TRT and/or international broadcasters. Examples include "How Art Made The World" and "Pilot Guides".
 Sinemasal – Selected examples of fine and more arty Turkish cinema, every Sunday night.
 European Vision – Following Turkey's progress with regards to European Union membership, Avrupa Viziyonu provides expert advice and analysis on the process, covering all areas from agriculture to youth.
 Rengahenk – Daily programme covering the latest news from the world of culture and art.
 Music – Classical music concerts, ballet and opera, Turkish folk and classical music, world music.

In the past 

Like its sister channel TRT 1, TRT 2 aired many world-known series for the first time in Turkey. Among them were Married... with Children, Wiseguy, 21 Jump Street, Hill Street Blues,  Beauty and the Beast,  Yesenia, The Young and the Restless, ALF, Los Ricos También Lloran, Lovejoy, Small Wonder,   Stingray, MacGyver, Airwolf, The Yellow Rose, Mike Hammer, Fame, The Twilight Zone, Matlock, Crime Story, Tour of Duty,  Lottery!, Diff'rent Strokes,  Gimme a Break!, St. Elsewhere, Happy Days, My Secret Identity, Who's the Boss? and The Jeffersons.

From 1989 to 2001 TRT Gap was broadcasting on TRT 2 before eventually moving to TRT 3. After the move, it began broadcasting 24 hours a day on January 31, 2001 as part of the corporate logo revamp and restructuring of its channels, which saw TRT 2 relaunched as a news and culturally-oriented channel with rolling news coverage filling up the daytime space left by TRT Gap and cultural programming during primetime.

Prior to the launch of TRT Haber in May 2010, TRT 2 used to function mostly as a news channel during the day and in the early hours with on the hour news plus analysis, local news, economic news, health advice, sports news and discussion. Prime time news programmes also exist in the form of Kirmizi Hat and live simulcasts of the morning and the main evening news bulletins from its flagship channel, TRT 1.

On screen identity 

 Like other TRT channels, TRT 2 broadcasts 24 hours. A short startup is broadcast at 5:00 am. On this start-up, first the TRT ident is shown, followed by the daily programme list and Turkish National Anthem.
 Prior to the launch of TRT Haber, this channel was famous for having an on-screen clock at the top right of the screen all the time except for commercial breaks. Since the relaunch in February 2019, it no longer airs an on-screen clock.

Logos

See also 

 List of television stations in Turkey

References

External links 

 Official Website 

Television stations in Turkey
Turkish-language television stations
Television channels and stations established in 1986
1986 establishments in Turkey
Turkish Radio and Television Corporation